The 1925 Isle of Man Tourist Trophy was the second and final year of the Ultra-Lightweight class for motorcycles of 175 cc capacity. This was the third year of the Sidecar race, which was also dropped after 1925.

During the Lightweight TT race, Wal Handley led the first two laps by over two minutes from C. W. "Paddy" Johnston, riding a Cotton, but a puncture caused Handley to slip off his motorcycle at Signpost Corner.

Ultra-Lightweight 175 cc Race

Junior 350 cc Race

Senior 500 cc Race

Lightweight TT
It was held on Wednesday, June 19th, 1925 at 9:30 am over a distance of 226 miles and 750 yards, 6 laps of 37.75 miles each. The machines were limited of cylinder capacity not exceeding 250cc. All nineteen entries started the race and only five riders finished.

Sidecar TT
It was held on Friday, June 19th, 1925 at 1:30pm over a distance of 151  miles and 680 yards, 4 laps of 37.75 miles each. Sidecar TT machines were limited of cylinder capacity not exceeding 600cc. All 18 entries started the race at one minute intervals and six finished.

References

External links
Detailed race results

1925 in British motorsport
1925
Isle